Molinaro is an Italian-language occupational surname for a miller. Notable people with the surname include:
 Al Molinaro, American actor
 Cristian Molinaro, Italian football player
 Édouard Molinaro, French film director and screenwriter
 George Molinaro, American politician
 Giulia Molinaro, Italian professional golfer
 James Molinaro, Staten Island, New York politician
 Jim Molinaro, American football player
 Joanne Lee Molinaro, American attorney and vegan author
 Lisa Molinaro, American musician
 Marc Molinaro, New York (state) politician
 Melissa Molinaro, Canadian-American popular music singer
 Simone Molinaro, Italian composer
 Tamara Molinaro, Italian race car driver≈
 Ursule Molinaro, French-American writer
 Vince Molinaro, Business strategist, public speaker, and author

See also

Italian-language surnames
Occupational surnames